Chalybeate Springs may refer to:

Chalybeate Springs, Georgia
Chalybeate Springs, North Carolina

See also
Chalybeate (disambiguation)